Stelios Prosalikas (born ) is a retired Greek male volleyball player and volleyball coach. As a player, he had 44 appearances with Greece men's national volleyball team. He played for Olympiacos for 10 years (1972–1982), winning 6 Greek Championships, 1 Greek Cup and the 4th place in the 1981–1982 CEV Champions League Final Four.

Prosalikas coached for Olympiacos, AEK, Panathinaikos, and Greece's national team.

He coached Greece to the 5th place in the 2004 Olympic Games in Athens. From 2008 to 2010 he was president of the Hellenic Volleyball Federation.

References

External links
 Stelios Prosalikas interview at volleynews.gr

1953 births
Living people
Greek men's volleyball players
Olympiacos S.C. players
Olympiacos S.C. coaches
Panathinaikos V.C. coaches
Volleyball players from Athens